John Hall Brockway (January 31, 1801 – July 29, 1870) was a U.S. Representative from Connecticut.

Biography
Born the son of the Reverend Diodate and Miranda Hall Brockway in Ellington, Connecticut, Brockway pursued preparatory studies and was graduated from Yale College, New Haven, Connecticut, in 1820, at the age of twenty. He taught school, and studied law in the office of Seth P. Staples, Esq. He was admitted to the bar in April 1823 and commenced practice in Ellington. On January 12, 1829, he married Flavia Feild Colton and they had three daughters.

Career
From 1832 to 1838, Brockway served as member of the State House of Representatives. He was also a state senator in the Senate in 1834.

Brockway was elected as a Whig to the 26th and 27th United States Congress. He served from March 4, 1839 to March 3, 1843. He subsequently served as prosecuting attorney for Tolland County from August 1849 to April 1867, when he resigned due to health reasons.

Shortly before the Civil War Brockway hosted a recent graduate of Yale College, Henry Billings Brown, to study law at his office.  Brown later served on the Supreme Court of the United States from 1890-1906.

Death
Brockway died in Ellington, Connecticut on July 29, 1870 (age 69 years, 179 days). He is interred at Ellington Center Cemetery.

References

External links

1801 births
1870 deaths
Connecticut state senators
Members of the Connecticut House of Representatives
Yale College alumni
Whig Party members of the United States House of Representatives from Connecticut
19th-century American politicians
People from Ellington, Connecticut